Meritxell Mas Pujadas (born 25 December 1994) is a Spanish competitor in synchronised swimming.

She won 3 silver medals at the 2013 World Aquatics Championships. She also won a silver and a bronze at the 2014 European Aquatics Championships.

Notes

References

Spain gains third medal in Barça

External links
 
 
 
 

1994 births
Living people
Spanish synchronized swimmers
World Aquatics Championships medalists in synchronised swimming
Synchronized swimmers at the 2013 World Aquatics Championships
Synchronized swimmers at the 2015 World Aquatics Championships
Artistic swimmers at the 2019 World Aquatics Championships
European Aquatics Championships medalists in synchronised swimming
Sportspeople from Granollers
Synchronized swimmers at the 2020 Summer Olympics
Olympic synchronized swimmers of Spain